Ghost Lab is a 2021 Thai film directed by Paween Purijitpanya, written by Vasudhorn Piyaromna, Paween Purijitpanya and Tossaphon Riantong and starring Thanapob Leeratanakachorn, Paris Intarakomalyasut and Nuttanicha Dungwattanawanich. The film, produced by GDH 559, was released as a Netflix original film and received mixed reviews, praising cast performance but criticising the weak storyline and visual effects.

Plot 
After witnessing a haunting in their hospital, two doctors become dangerously obsessed with obtaining scientific proof that ghosts exist.

Cast 
 Thanapob Leeratanakachorn as Wee
 Paris Intarakomalyasut as Gla
 Nuttanicha Dungwattanawanich as Mai

Critical response 

Alicia Moore of UK Film Review called it an "enjoyable watch" and said the "plot follows is extraordinary and really makes your head spin with possibilities and explanations that could fit into the film’s universe."

References

External links
 
 

2021 films
Thai ghost films
Thai-language films
GDH 559 films
Thai-language Netflix original films